Alex Watson (born 24 October 1957) is an Australian modern pentathlete. He was educated at North Sydney Boys High School He competed at the 1984, 1988 and 1992 Summer Olympics.

Watson was disqualified at the 1988 Summer Olympics for excessive levels of caffeine, but later cleared his name and was allowed to compete in the 1992 Barcelona Olympics.

References

External links
 

1957 births
Living people
People educated at North Sydney Boys High School
Australian male modern pentathletes
Australian sportspeople in doping cases
Olympic modern pentathletes of Australia
Modern pentathletes at the 1984 Summer Olympics
Modern pentathletes at the 1988 Summer Olympics
Modern pentathletes at the 1992 Summer Olympics
Sportspeople from Sydney